Micropsyche is a genus of butterflies in the family Lycaenidae.

Polyommatini
Lycaenidae genera